Srinagarindra is a district (amphoe) of Phatthalung province, southern Thailand.

Geography
Neighboring districts are (from the north clockwise) Si Banphot, Khuan Khanun, Mueang Phatthalung, and Kong Ra of Phattalung Province; Yan Ta Khao and Na Yong of Trang province.

History
The minor district (king amphoe) was established on 26 June 1996, when it was split off from Mueang Phatthalung district. The new district became effective on 15 July 1996. At first named Chumphon after the main tambon, it was renamed Srinagarindra on 30 December 1996.

On 15 May 2007, all 81 minor districts were upgraded to full districts. On 24 August the upgrade became official.

Administration
The district is divided into four sub-districts (tambons), which are further subdivided into 42 villages (mubans). There are no municipal (thesabans). There are four tambon administrative organizations (TAO).

References

External links
amphoe.com

Districts of Phatthalung province